Tellimagrandin II is the first of the ellagitannins formed from 1,2,3,4,6-pentagalloyl-glucose. It can be found in Geum japonicum and Syzygium aromaticum (clove). 

Tellimagrandin II is an isomer of punicafolin or nupharin A, but the hexahydroxydiphenoyl group is not attached to the same hydroxyl groups in the glucose molecule.

The compound shows anti-herpesvirus properties.

Metabolism 
It is formed by oxidation of pentagalloyl glucose in Tellima grandiflora by the enzyme pentagalloylglucose: O(2) oxidoreductase, a laccase-type phenol oxidase.

It is further oxidized to casuarictin, a molecule formed via oxidative dehydrogenation of 2 other galloyl groups in Casuarina and Stachyurus species.

Dimerization 
It is laccase-catalyzed dimerized to cornusiin E in Tellima grandiflora.

Uses 
It has an extremely weak basic(essentially neutral) compound. The compound shows anti-herpesvirus properties.

References 

Ellagitannins
Polyphenols